Gung Ho is the eighth studio album by Patti Smith, released March 21, 2000 on Arista Records.

Release
Gung Ho was released on March 21, 2000 by Arista Records. The title refers to a Chinese phrase meaning "work together" adopted by the US Marines during World War II as a morale-building slogan. It is the first Patti Smith album to not include her on the cover (it shows, instead, a picture of her father, Grant Smith).

The song "New Party" was used as the official song for the 2000 Ralph Nader's presidential campaign.

Smith wrote the song "Grateful" in tribute to Jerry Garcia on August 9, 1995, the day of his death.

As of February 2004, Gung Ho had sold 49,000 copies in the United States according to Nielsen Soundscan.

Critical reception

Gung Ho was included in Rolling Stones "Top 50 Albums of 2000".

The song "Glitter in Their Eyes" was nominated for a Grammy Award for Best Female Rock Vocal Performance in 2001.

Track listing

PersonnelBand Patti Smith – vocals, guitar, photography
 Lenny Kaye – guitar
 Jay Dee Daugherty – drums
 Oliver Ray – guitar
 Tony Shanahan – bass, keyboardsAdditional personnel'
 Danton Supple – engineer (Sear Sound recording studio, NYC); mixing (The Church Studios, London and Eden Studios, London)
Gil Norton – production; mixing (The Church Studios, London and Eden Studios, London)
Grant Hart – piano, Farfisa, "Persuasion"
Grant Smith – album cover model, Townsend, Australia, 1942
 Jackson Smith – guitar solo, "Persuasion"
 Jake Davies – computer engineer (Sear Sound recording studio, NYC)
 Mark Phythers – computer engineer (Sear Sound recording studio, NYC)
 Margery Greenspan – art direction
Michael Stipe – backing vocalist, "Glitter in Their Eyes"
 Paul Angelli – mastering engineer (Sterling Sound, NYC)
 Ben E. Franklin – penny whistle, "Libbie's Song"
 Rebecca Weiner Tompkins – violin, "Libbie's Song"
Kimberly Smith – mandolin, "Libbie's Song"
Skaila Kanga – harp, "Lo and Beholden"
Steven Sebring – band photography
Ted Jensen – mastering engineer (Sterling Sound, NYC)
 Todd Parker – assistant engineer (Sear Sound recording studio, NYC)
Tom Verlaine – guitar solo, "Glitter in Their Eyes"
 Wade Raley – backing vocalist, "Glitter in Their Eyes"

Charts

References

External links
 
 Gung Ho at Sony BMG
 Lyrics, samples, and photos at GungHo2000.com

2000 albums
Albums produced by Gil Norton
Arista Records albums
Patti Smith albums